The Nutt House is an American sitcom television series that aired for five episodes on NBC from September 20 to October 25, 1989.

Overview
The Nutt House was the creation of executive producers Mel Brooks and Alan Spencer and was a broad farce about a once-prestigious New York City hotel, which had of late fallen on hard times, due in part to it being named for the proprietress, Edwina Nutt (Cloris Leachman). Other characters included manager Reginald Tarkington (Harvey Korman), and head of housekeeping Ms. Frick (also portrayed by Leachman). Frick appeared in every episode, Mrs. Nutt only in the pilot.

The Nutt House was a very broad satire in which the main story was periodically interrupted by short, unrelated, and often surreal gags. Its audience was quite a narrow one, and it was cancelled within 6 weeks of its premiere. However, all 11 of the produced episodes were broadcast on BBC 2 in the United Kingdom, where it became a moderate success being shown on Saturday evening following Clive James' Saturday Night Clive. Brooks appeared on this programme to promote the first episode of The Nutt House on 14 October 1989. However, to the dismay of viewers, the BBC did not give the show a fixed airtime. Usually shown around 23.00 hours (but sometimes as late as 23.30), the final episode inexplicably aired at 19.30 on 16 December 1989.

Cast
 Cloris Leachman as Ms. Frick (also Edwina Nutt in the pilot episode)
 Harvey Korman as Reginald Tarkington
 Brian McNamara as Charles Nutt III
 Molly Hagan as Sally Lonnaneck
 Gregory Itzin as Dennis
 Mark Blankfield as Freddy

Episodes

References

External links

1980s American sitcoms
1989 American television series debuts
1989 American television series endings
NBC original programming
Television series by ABC Studios
Television series created by Mel Brooks
Television series created by Alan Spencer
Television series set in hotels
Television shows set in New York City